Jan Pedersen (born 27 July 1967) is a speedway rider from Denmark. He is not to be confused with Jan O. Pedersen.

Jan was a highly successful rider, performing regularly as a heat leader from the beginning of his career, until his retirement in 2000. Famed for being a no-nonsense, do all the talking on the track rider. He was a very popular Arena Essex stalwart, winning the Essex Championship in 1997, a national individual title. He then finished 2nd in 1998 in the very same tournament, only losing out in a late evening run-off against a top-form Carl Stonehewer. Jan enjoyed a decorated career, specifically with Arena Essex, being an integral part of two very successful seasons for the team, 1991 and 1997 respectively, in which 1991 being commended as the most dominant Premier League performance in British speedway history.

Speedway career
He rode in the top tier of British Speedway, riding for various clubs from 1991 until 2000.

He reached the 1990 Nordic final during the 1990 Individual Speedway World Championship.

References 

1967 births
Living people
Danish speedway riders
Berwick Bandits riders
Ipswich Witches riders
Lakeside Hammers riders
Milton Keynes Knights riders
Poole Pirates riders
Reading Racers riders
Rye House Rockets riders
Swindon Robins riders